Smoke Rings in the Dark is the third studio album by American country music singer Gary Allan. It was released on October 26, 1999 as his first album for MCA Records Nashville after leaving Decca Records Nashville. The album was certified platinum by the RIAA, and it produced three singles: the title track, "Lovin' You Against My Will", and "Right Where I Need to Be", which respectively reached number 12, number 34 and number 5 on the U.S. Billboard Hot Country Songs chart. "Right Where I Need to Be" was also Allan's first Top 5 country hit and his third Top 10.

"Don't Tell Mama" was previously recorded by Ty Herndon on his 1996 album Living in a Moment, and later by Doug Stone on his 2007 album My Turn, and by Frankie Ballard on his 2014 album Sunshine & Whiskey under the title "Don't Tell Mama I Was Drinking". In addition, "Runaway" is a cover of a Del Shannon song. Allan's rendition also charted at number 74 on the country charts in 2000 based on unsolicited airplay.

Track listing

Charts

Weekly charts

Year-end charts

Certifications

Personnel
Gary Allan – lead vocals
Lisa Cochran – background vocals
David Campbell – string arranger, conductor
Christy Cornelius – background vocals
Chad Cromwell – drums
Dan Dugmore – pedal steel guitar, acoustic guitar
Steve Gibson – electric guitar
Randy Hardison – background vocals
Jake Kelly – acoustic guitar, electric guitar
Brice Long – background vocals
Marilyn Martin – background vocals
The Nashville String Machine – strings
Steve Nathan – piano, keyboards
Michael Rhodes – bass guitar
Brent Rowan – electric guitar
John Wesley Ryles – background vocals
Lisa Silver – background vocals
Hank Singer – fiddle
Harry Stinson – background vocals
Wynn Varble – background vocals
Bergen White – background vocals
John Willis – acoustic guitar
Curtis Young – background vocals

References

1999 albums
Gary Allan albums
MCA Records albums
Albums produced by Tony Brown (record producer)
Albums produced by Byron Hill
Albums produced by Mark Wright (record producer)